Kyin is a form of wrestling from Myanmar. It is practiced by the Rakhine people, a minority group in Myanmar. It is practiced in the Rakhine State.  Tournaments of this sport are usually held during big occasions, for example, Rakhine State Day events.

In Kyin wrestling tournaments, practitioners usually put on a display of warming-up dancing, which is called "kyin kwin" in their local language. Then the fighting is on. The rules are simple. No punching. No touching on the face. No attacking below the belt. The winner throws his opponent to the ground a fixed number of times.

See also
Naban
Khmer traditional wrestling

APA References
 Aung, N. (2013, December 22). For love of the fight. Myanmar Times. Retrieved July 15, 2020, from https://www.mmtimes.com/lifestyle/9114-for-love-of-the-fight.html 
Kyin: the traditional Rakhine wrestling. (2018, September 2). Global New Light of Myanmar. Retrieved July 15, 2020, from https://www.globalnewlightofmyanmar.com/kyin-the-traditional-rakhine-wrestling/ 
Olympic Council Of Asia - Myanmar. Retrieved Dec 16, 2020, from https://ocasia.org/noc/countries/45-mya-myanmar.html
Information Ecosystems Paper 2: southern Rakhine, June 2020. Retrieved Dec 16, 2020, from https://coar-global.org/2020/06/21/information-ecosystems-paper-2-southern-rakhine/

References

Sport in Myanmar
Sports originating in Myanmar